Krack or KRACK may refer to:

 KRACK, an attack on the Wi-Fi Protected Access protocol
 Krack (film), an Indian Telugu-language action film

Persons
 Erhard Krack (1931–2000), East German politician
 Jake Krack (born 1984), American fiddle player

See also
 Crack (disambiguation)